The Hound of the Baskervilles is a 1937 German mystery film directed by Carl Lamac and starring Peter Voss, Fritz Odemar and Fritz Rasp. It is an adaptation of the 1902 Sherlock Holmes story The Hound of the Baskervilles by Arthur Conan Doyle. It was shot at the Babelsberg Studios in Potsdam and on location at the neo-Gothic Moyland Castle. The film's sets were designed by the art directors Wilhelm Depenau and Karl Vollbrecht.

Plot 
For centuries, Baskerville Castle has been cursed. A spooky dog ​​is up to mischief in the moor near the stately home. Night after night his bloodcurdling howl sounds and goes through marrow and leg. Lord Charles Baskerville is currently the latest victim of the ghostly beast: After a mysterious phone call, he left the property and is found dead on the moor. He succumbed to a heart attack from fear. Contrary to expectations, the darkling behind this mysterious activity has not yet achieved its goal. Because from a branch of the Baskervilles, a descendant, Lord Henry Baskerville, suddenly appears at the castle. He should now take possession.

Also residing in the castle is a distant relative of the Barrymores, Lady Beryl Vendeleure, who originally intended to sell her land and moor to the old lord. The newcomer Henry quickly falls in love with her. In order not to let Henry Baskerville also become a victim of the ghost dog, executor Dr. Mortimer, family doctor and friend of old Lord Charles, asked the London master detective Sherlock Holmes for help. As a first measure, Holmes sends his faithful companion Dr. Watson to Baskerville Castle to keep a close eye on what was happening. Is the secretive house servant Barrymore behind the events, who returns light signals coming from the moor at night? Or is it possible that the convict who went into hiding on the moor, Barrymore's brother-in-law, is the mastermind? And what about the whimsical butterfly collector Stapleton, a self-confessed nature lover and explorer?

Meanwhile, Holmes has long since appeared secretly in the area and is pursuing a lead of his own. Telephone calls are made between Castle Baskerville and an unknown party at night, and soon the situation for Henry Baskerville becomes more and more threatening. But he's preoccupied with his new flame, Beryl, and doesn't take the warnings too seriously. His careless behavior is almost fatal to Henry Baskerville. When cries for help are heard from the moor in the middle of the night, Henry runs there to rescue the woman of his heart who has just been kidnapped. There he is finally confronted with the dog and can only escape with difficulty. At the last moment, Holmes and Watson show up and take out the creepy animal with several gunshots. Stapleton, who is behind the attacks, is pursued by the detectives and flees into the depths of the moor, which swallows him up. Beryl Vendeleure, actually Stapleton's sister and bound by him, can be freed.

Cast
 Peter Voß as Lord Henry Baskerville
 Friedrich Kayßler as Lord Charles Baskerville
 Alice Brandt as Beryl Vendeleure
 Bruno Güttner as Sherlock Holmes
 Siegfried Schürenberg as Sherlock Holmes (voice, uncredited)
 Fritz Odemar as Dr. Watson
 Fritz Rasp as Barrymore
 Lili Schoenborn-Anspach as Elisa, Mrs. Barrymore
 Erich Ponto as Stapleton
 Ernst Rotmund as Dr. Mortimer
 Gertrud Wolle as landlady of Sherlock Holmes
 Paul Rehkopf as convict
 Klaus Pohl as notary
 Ilka Thimm as telephone operator
 Ernst Albert Schaach as hotel manager

References

Bibliography

External links
 
 

Films based on The Hound of the Baskervilles
1937 films
Films of Nazi Germany
1930s mystery films
German mystery films
1930s German-language films
Films directed by Karel Lamač
Sherlock Holmes films
Films set in London
Films set in Devon
Bavaria Film films
German black-and-white films
1930s German films
Films shot at Babelsberg Studios